Thomas Michael Flanagan (born 21 October 1991) is a professional footballer who plays as a defender for  club Shrewsbury Town and the Northern Ireland national football team.

Career

Milton Keynes Dons
Flanagan captained the Milton Keynes Dons (MK Dons) under-18 team in January 2010 while a second-year scholar. He made his first-team debut for the MK Dons as an 82nd-minute substitute in a 5–0 defeat to Carlisle United on 13 February 2010.

In August 2010, Flanagan signed his first professional contract with Milton Keynes Dons, on a 12-month deal with the option of a second year. Six months later, he joined Kettering Town, where he made his first professional start while out on loan at Kettering Town during the 2010–11 season. Soon after, his loan was extended until 3 March on 1 February. A number of top performances earned him a recall and was put straight into the line up for a midweek defeat at home, to Leyton Orient where he made his league debut of the season in a 3–2 loss on 15 February 2011. Later in the season, Flanagan also started the final game of the season against Oldham Athletic which ended up in a 2–1 away win. In 2011, he signed a new contract with the Dons; a one-year deal with the option of an additional 12 months.

The following season, Flanagan was on the bench at the beginning of the season until playing his first match of the season against Charlton Athletic on 27 September 2011. Two months later on 19 November 2011, Flanagan scored his first goal for the club in a 5–1 win over Colchester United. Later on the season, Flanagan scored two more goals against Stevenage and Notts County. Flanagan earned a regular place in the starting eleven although being on the substitute bench. Flanagan made 21 appearances and scored three.

On 24 March 2014, Flanagan signed a new one-year contract with the Dons.

Gillingham (loan)

On 30 July 2012, Flanagan signed a six-month loan deal with Gillingham of League Two, After two appearances at Gillingham so far, Flanagan express delight of joining Gillingham and that the club went to have a good start Three months at Gillingham, he scored his first goal in a 4–1 win over Burton Albion After the match, Flanagan says increasing playing time helping his form at Gillingham. His loan spell at Gillingham ended when he suffered a foot injury.

While at Gillingham, he was called up for the Northern Ireland U21 squad.

Barnet (loan)

On 14 March 2013, Flanagan joined another League Two side, Barnet, on loan until the end of the 2012–2013 season. He made his debut for Barnet as an 82nd-minute substitute for John Oster in a 3–2 defeat at Accrington Stanley on 16 March 2013.

Stevenage (loan)

On 26 March 2014, Flanagan joined fellow League One side Stevenage on loan until the end of the 2013–14 season. On 25 April 2014, Flanagan was recalled from his loan due to injuries and fitness concerns in the Milton Keynes Dons squad.

Plymouth (loan)
On 9 January 2015, Flanagan joined League 2 side Plymouth Argyle on loan for a month.

Burton Albion
On 25 August 2015, Flanagan joined League One side Burton Albion on a one-year deal following his release from MK Dons.

He was transfer listed by the club at the end of the 2017–18 season, following their relegation.

Sunderland
Sunderland completed the signing of Tom Flanagan on 28 June 2018, he signed a two-year deal. On the 23 July 2020 he signed a contract extension until the end of the 2021-2022 season.

Shrewsbury Town
On 31 January 2022, Flanagan joined Shrewsbury Town on a two-and-a-half year deal.

International career
On 7 November 2012, Flanagan was called up to the Northern Ireland U21 team for their International Challenge Match against England which was played on 13 November 2012. On 24 August 2016 Flanagan received his first call up to the senior Northern Ireland squad by manager Michael O'Neill. Flanagan made his senior debut for Northern Ireland in a friendly 1–0 win over New Zealand on 2 June 2017.

Career statistics

Club

Honours
Sunderland
EFL Trophy: 2020–21; runner-up: 2018–19

References

External links
Tom Flanagan profile at the Milton Keynes Dons website

1991 births
Living people
Footballers from Hammersmith
English footballers
Association footballers from Northern Ireland
Northern Ireland international footballers
Northern Ireland under-21 international footballers
Association football defenders
Milton Keynes Dons F.C. players
Kettering Town F.C. players
Gillingham F.C. players
Barnet F.C. players
Stevenage F.C. players
Burton Albion F.C. players
Sunderland A.F.C. players
Shrewsbury Town F.C. players
English Football League players
National League (English football) players
English people of Irish descent
English people of Northern Ireland descent